Below are lists of the countries and territories formerly ruled or administered by The United Kingdom or part of the British Empire (including military occupations that did not retain the pre-war central government), with their independence days. Some countries did not gain their independence on a single date, therefore the latest day of independence is shown with a break down of dates further down. A total of 65 countries have claimed their independence from British Empire or The United Kingdom.

Colonies, Protectorates, and Mandates

Evolution of Dominions to independence 

†Adopted by Australia in 1942, but was backdated to confirm the validity of legislation passed by the Australian Parliament during World War II.

Military occupations that did not retain the pre-war central government

Former British Crown Colonies that declared independence then later restored British rule

British Overseas Territories independence/sovereignty referendums

Territories which were relinquished to another sovereign state

Countries of the United Kingdom that have voted against independence

See also 
 Self-determination
 Commonwealth of Nations
 List of national independence days
 Foreign relations of the United Kingdom
 Foreign, Commonwealth and Development Office
 Special Committee on Decolonization

Notes

References 

 United Kingdom
Independence Day
British Empire-related lists
History of the British Empire
History of the Commonwealth of Nations
United Kingdom former colonies
 
Overseas empires